The Chongqing World Financial Center, also known as Global Financial Building is a late-modernist supertall skyscraper in Chongqing, China. The -tall  office tower contain 79 floors. The skyscraper was first proposed in 2007 and broke ground in 2010. Construction of the glass and steel-building was completed in 2014. Upon completion, it was the tallest building in Chongqing, and has been surpassed by the Chongqing International Trade and Commerce Center in 2017.

See also
List of tallest buildings in Chongqing
List of tallest buildings in China

References

2014 establishments in China
Office buildings completed in 2014
Skyscraper office buildings in Chongqing